On the Ropes may refer to:
 On the Ropes (1999 film), an American documentary film
 On the Ropes (2011 film), a British mockumentary film
 On the Ropes (album), a 1999 album by Mint Royale
 On the Ropes (TV series), a 2018 Australian drama series